Below is the list of populated places in Bartın Province, Turkey by the districts. In the following lists first place in each list is the administrative center of the district.

Bartın
	Bartın
	Ağdacı, Bartın
	Ahmetpaşa, Bartın
	Akağaç, Bartın
	Akbaba, Bartın
	Akbaş, Bartın
	Akçalı, Bartın
	Akçamescit, Bartın
	Akgöz, Bartın
	Akıncılar, Bartın
	Akmanlar, Bartın
	Akpınar, Bartın
	Alibaş, Bartın
	Arıönü, Bartın
	Arıt, Bartın
	Aşağıdere, Bartın
	Avgölü, Bartın
	Aydınlar, Bartın
	Bakioğlu, Bartın
	Barkaçboz, Bartın
	Başoğlu, Bartın
	Bayıryüzü, Bartın
	Bedil, Bartın
	Beşköprü, Bartın
	Budakdüzü, Bartın
	Büyükkıran, Bartın
	Büyükkızılkum, Bartın
	Celilbeyoğlu, Bartın
	Çakırdemirci, Bartın
	Çakırkadı, Bartın
	Çakırömerağa, Bartın
	Çamaltı, Bartın
	Çamlık, Bartın
	Çaybükü, Bartın
	Çayır, Bartın
	Çeştepe, Bartın
	Çiftlikköy, Bartın
	Çöpbey, Bartın
	Çukurbük, Bartın
	Dallıca, Bartın
	Darıören, Bartın
	Derbent, Bartın
	Dırazlar, Bartın
	Doğaşı, Bartın
	Ecikler, Bartın
	Ellibaş, Bartın
	Epçiler, Bartın
	Epçilerkadı, Bartın
	Esbey, Bartın
	Esenyurt, Bartın
	Eskiemirler, Bartın
	Eskihamidiye, Bartın
	Eyüpoğlu, Bartın
	Fırınlı, Bartın
	Gecen, Bartın
	Gençali, Bartın
	Geriş, Bartın
	Gerişkatırcı, Bartın
	Gökçekıran, Bartın
	Gözpınar, Bartın
	Gürgenpınarı, Bartın
	Gürpınar, Bartın
	Güzelcehisar, Bartın
	Hacıhatipoğlu, Bartın
	Hacıosmanoğlu, Bartın
	Hanyeri, Bartın
	Hasanefendi, Bartın
	Hasankadı, Bartın
	Hasanlar, Bartın
	Hatipler, Bartın
	Hıdırlar, Bartın
	Hocaoğlu, Bartın
	İmamlar, Bartın
	Kabagöz, Bartın
	Kaman, Bartın
	Karacaoğlu, Bartın
	Karahüseyinli, Bartın
	Karainler, Bartın
	Karaköyşeyhler, Bartın
	Karamazak, Bartın
	Karasu, Bartın
	Karayakup, Bartın
	Karşıyaka, Bartın
	Kaşbaşı, Bartın
	Kayacılar, Bartın
	Kayadibi, Bartın
	Kayadibiçavuş, Bartın
	Kayadibikavlak, Bartın
	Kışlaköy, Bartın
	Kızılelma, Bartın
	Kocareis, Bartın
	Kozcağız, Bartın
	Köyyeri, Bartın
	Kumaçorak, Bartın
	Kurt, Bartın
	Kutlubeydemirci
	Kutlubeytabaklar
	Kutlubeyyazıcılar
	Küçükkızılkum
	Kümesler, Bartın
	Mamak, Bartın
	Mekeçler, Bartın
	Muratbey, Bartın
	Okçular, Bartın
	Ören, Bartın
	Özbaşı, Bartın
	Saraylı, Bartın
	Serdar, Bartın
	Sipahiler, Bartın
	Sofular, Bartın
	Söğütlü, Bartın
	Sülek, Bartın
	Sütlüce, Bartın
	Şabankadı, Bartın
	Şahin, Bartın
	Şahne, Bartın
	Şarköy, Bartın
	Şiremirçavuş, Bartın
	Şiremirtabaklar, Bartın
	Şirinköy, Bartın
	Tabanözü, Bartın
	Tasmacı, Bartın
	Terkehaliller, Bartın
	Terkehatipler, Bartın
	Topluca, Bartın
	Tuzcular, Bartın
	Uğurlar, Bartın
	Ulugeçitambarcı, Bartın
	Ulugeçitkadı, Bartın
	Uluköy, Bartın
	Ustaoğlu, Bartın
	Uzunöz, Bartın
	Yanaz, Bartın
	Yeğenli, Bartın
	Yenihamidiye, Bartın
	Yeniköy, Bartın
	Yeşilkaya, Bartın
	Yeşilyurt, Bartın
	Yıldız, Bartın
	Yukarışeyhler, Bartın

Amasra
	Amasra
	Acarlar, Amasra
	Ahatlar, Amasra
	Akkonak, Amasra
	Aliobası, Amasra
	Bostanlar, Amasra
	Cumayanı, Amasra
	Çakrazboz, Amasra
	Çakrazova, Amasra
	Çakrazşeyhler, Amasra
	Çanakçılar, Amasra
	Esenler, Amasra
	Göçkün, Amasra
	Göçkündemirci, Amasra
	Gömü, Amasra
	Hatipler, Amasra
	İnciğez, Amasra
	İnpiri, Amasra
	Kalaycı, Amasra
	Karakaçak, Amasra
	Kazpınarı, Amasra
	Kocaköy, Amasra
	Makaracı, Amasra
	Saraydüzü, Amasra
	Şenyurt, Amasra
	Şükürler, Amasra
	Tarlaağzı, Amasra
	Topallar, Amasra
	Topderesi, Amasra
	Yahyayazıcılar, Amasra
	Yukarısal, Amasra

Kurucaşile
	Kurucaşile
	Alapınar, Kurucaşile
	Aydoğmuş, Kurucaşile
	Başköy, Kurucaşile
	Curunlu, Kurucaşile
	Çayaltı, Kurucaşile
	Danişment, Kurucaşile
	Demirci, Kurucaşile
	Dizlermezeci, Kurucaşile
	Elvanlar, Kurucaşile
	Hacıköy, Kurucaşile
	Hisarköy, Kurucaşile
	İlyasgeçidi, Kurucaşile
	Kaleköy, Kurucaşile
	Kanatlı, Kurucaşile
	Kapısuyu, Kurucaşile
	Karaman, Kurucaşile
	Kavaklı, Kurucaşile
	Kirlikmüslimhoca, Kurucaşile
	Kömeç, Kurucaşile
	Meydan, Kurucaşile
	Ovatekkeönü, Kurucaşile
	Ömerler, Kurucaşile
	Paşalılar, Kurucaşile
	Sarıderesi, Kurucaşile
	Şeyhler, Kurucaşile
	Uğurlu, Kurucaşile
	Yeniköy, Kurucaşile
	Ziyaretköy, Kurucaşile

Ulus
	Ulus
	Abdipaşa, Ulus
	Abdurrahman, Ulus
	Ağaköy, Ulus
	Akörensöküler, Ulus
	Aktaş, Ulus
	Alıçlı, Ulus
	Alpı, Ulus
	Arpacık, Ulus
	Aşağıçamlı, Ulus
	Aşağıçerçi, Ulus
	Aşağıdere, Ulus
	Aşağıemirce, Ulus
	Aşağıköy, Ulus
	Bağdatlı, Ulus
	Bahçecik, Ulus
	Balıcak, Ulus
	Buğurlar, Ulus
	Ceyüpler, Ulus
	Çavuşköy, Ulus
	Çerde, Ulus
	Çubukbeli, Ulus
	Çubuklu, Ulus
	Dereli, Ulus
	Dibektaş, Ulus
	Dodurga, Ulus
	Doğanköy, Ulus
	Dorucaşahinci, Ulus
	Döngeller, Ulus
	Dörekler, Ulus
	Düzköy, Ulus
	Eldeş, Ulus
	Elmacık, Ulus
	Eseler, Ulus
	Gökpınar, Ulus
	Güneyören, Ulus
	Hasanören, Ulus
	Hisarköy, Ulus
	Hocaköy, Ulus
	Isırganlı, Ulus
	İbrahimderesi, Ulus
	İğneciler, Ulus
	İnceçam, Ulus
	Kadıköy, Ulus
	Kalecik, Ulus
	Karadiken, Ulus
	Karahasan, Ulus
	Karakışla, Ulus
	Kayabaşı, Ulus
	Keçideresi, Ulus
	Kıyıklar, Ulus
	Kızıllar, Ulus
	Kirazcık, Ulus
	Kirsinler, Ulus
	Konak, Ulus
	Konuklu, Ulus
	Kozanlı, Ulus
	Köklü, Ulus
	Kumluca, Ulus
	Küllü, Ulus
	Öncüler, Ulus
	Sarıfasıl, Ulus
	Sarnıç, Ulus
	Şirinler, Ulus
	Ulukaya, Ulus
	Uluköy, Ulus
	Üçsaray, Ulus
	Yenikışla, Ulus
	Yeniköy, Ulus
	Yılanlar, Ulus
	Yukarıdere, Ulus
	Zafer, Ulus

References

Geography of Bartın Province
Bartin
List